In the 2002–03 season, USM Blida is competing in Division 1 for the 16th time, as well as the Algerian Cup. It is their 6th consecutive season in the top flight of Algerian football. They will be competing in Division 1 and the Algerian Cup.

Squad list
Players and squad numbers last updated on 22 August 2002.Note: Flags indicate national team as has been defined under FIFA eligibility rules. Players may hold more than one non-FIFA nationality.

Competitions

Overview

Division 1

League table

Results summary

Results by round

Matches

Algerian Cup

Squad information

Appearances and goals

|-

Goalscorers
Includes all competitive matches. The list is sorted alphabetically by surname when total goals are equal.

Notes

References

USM Blida seasons
USM Blida